In recent decades, the fertility rate of the United States has declined, prompting projections of an aging population and workforce, as is already happening elsewhere in the developed world and some developing countries. Nevertheless, the rate of aging in the United States remains slower than that seen in many other countries. It remains unclear how population aging would affect the United States.

History 

The birth rate in the United States has declined steadily since the beginning of the 19th century, when the average person had as many as seven children. In a 1905 speech, President Theodore Roosevelt criticized Americans for having fewer children, and described the declining birth rate as a "race suicide" among Americans, quoting eugenicist Edward Alsworth Ross. In the 1930s, the Great Depression caused a substantial decrease in the birth rate, but this trend was reversed in the subsequent Baby Boomer generation.

Contrary to expectations, U.S. fertility rates never rebounded after the 2007-2008 Great Recession. More recently, the COVID-19 pandemic caused fertility to decline further, while also increasing the death rate in the country. At the same time, many women are choosing to have children later in life or are choosing a childless life altogether. Growing proportions of American women do not have children by the age of 30, breaking previous fertility trends where younger women made up the bulk of births. In 1976, 30% of those between 25 to 29 years of age, were childless compared to above 50% in 2018. While only 10% of women were childless in 1976 at the end of their reproductive years, it is projected that 25% of those born in 1992 will reach the same benchmark in 2032. This trend could cause the total population of the country to age significantly in the future.

In the modern world, it has become common for developed countries to fall below the replacement level of births or see population decline. Many of these countries have tried to launch government initiatives to combat this trend, including large cash incentives for having more children, but these programs have been largely ineffective.

From a demographic point of view, the labor shortage in the United States during the 2020s is inevitable due to the sheer size of the baby boomers. As the oldest economically active cohort, the baby boomers comprised about a quarter of the U.S. workforce in 2018. Though they were projected by economists to begin retiring in the 2010s, 29% of older (65–72 years of age) baby boomers in the United States remained active in the labor force in 2018, a large portion compared to older cohorts at the same age. Baby boomers were incentivized to postpone retirement in part because it allowed them to claim more Social Security benefits once they finally retired. The COVID-19 pandemic may have sped up the retirement of some baby boomers. The Pew Research Center reported that the number of baby boomers in retirement had increased by 3.2 million in 2020, the largest annual increase in the previous decade. But even before the pandemic, the United States had a gap between the number of job openings and the number of unemployed people.

Causes 
Population aging in the US is driven by a variety of factors, including increased access to birth control, and changing societal attitudes toward reproduction, resulting in lower fertility among modern Americans. Another major cause is the fact that the Baby Boomers, a large cohort, are getting older, adding a large group of older Americans to the population and causing the median age to move up. COVID-19 has reduced fertility. Furthermore, there is evidence that women are choosing to give birth at a later age, which could lead to a temporary drop in population growth.

Some of the birth rate decline may also have come from a fall in unintentional pregnancies, especially among adolescent girls. While economic troubles and climate anxiety are commonly cited reasons, data suggest they are not the primary factors behind falling fertility in the U.S. Rather, it is due to changing attitudes; today's young people, especially women, tend to prioritize and expect more from their careers and are less interested in having children.

Finally, a further factor contributing to an aging workforce is the fact that employment rates among older workers are increasing. The rate of people who continue working after they are 65 is relatively high in the US, when compared to other developed countries. For example, in 2011, 16.7% among people aged 65 and over and 29.9% among 65–69 were employed in the US.

Impacts 
By 2030, 20% of Americans are projected to be 65 and older. Both the overall population of the country and the average age are projected to increase over coming years. Given that older people tend to need more health services, some demographers have theorized a significant impact on the country resulting from these trends. Population aging could create an increasing need for services such as nursing homes and care-giving.

Economy 

A shortage of workers is expected in the U.S. workforce due to a declining labor participation rate. Projections show that the demand for labor needed now is not being fulfilled, and the gap between labor needed and labor available will continue to expand over the future. Owing to the relatively large size population size of those born between the end of WWII and the mid-1960s (referred to by some as the "Baby Boomers"), the number of people generally considered to be of working age is declining. Additionally, young people are spending more time in education and training and are entering the workforce at a later age, and therefore, there are fewer entering the workforce in their early twenties.  A loss in skilled and capable workers has made it harder for employers to recruit new staff. The retirement of members of the aging workforce could possibly result in the shortage of skilled labor in the future. A majority of experienced utility workers and hospital caregivers, for example, will be eligible for retirement. By the late 2010s, the United States found itself facing a shortage of tradespeople, a problem that persisted in the early 2020s despite the COVID-19 pandemic-induced recession and prospective employers offering higher salaries and paid training. Having an aging population accelerates industrial automation. Experts expect the labor crunch of the early 2020s will continue for years to come, due to not just the Great Resignation, but also the aging of the U.S. population, the decline of the labor participation rate, and falling rates of legal immigration.

Additionally, a shrinking birth rate could exacerbate economic inequality by increasing the importance of family inheritance, while an overall decrease in the population could shrink the economy by reducing the demand for basic goods like real estate.

Nevertheless, unlike their counterparts in many other countries East and West, American Baby Boomers had many children of their own, the Millennials, who are a large cohort relative to the nation's population and are themselves having a relatively high birth rate, as of the 2010s. Millennials and Generation Z have been responsible in a surge in labor participation in the U.S. as the same time as the contraction of the workforce of major economies. As a result, the United States will continue to have a significant number of consumers, investors and taxpayers in the upcoming decades. This gives the nation an economic edge over others.

Education 

Due to declining birth rates, the number of American high-school graduates is expected to drop after 2025, putting more pressure on institutions of higher learning at a time when many have already been permanently shut down. Many private colleges will not make it while public ones will struggle to convince state and local governments to keep funding them. Demand for education from the nation's top 100 colleges and universities, however, is likely to remain high, in part because of rising numbers of Indian and Chinese Americans, for whom higher education is of utmost importance. To survive, non-elite institutions will have to cut back or eliminate courses in the liberal arts and humanities, like gender studies, and expand those in emerging fields, such as artificial intelligence, and professional programs, such as law enforcement.

Geopolitics 

Because the United States is aging more slowly than any one of its main rivals, it will have an advantage in any future geopolitical contests. Given current demographic trends, it is unlikely that the United States will lose its dominant position to China and Russia. In fact, projections of China's economic growth from the early 2020s taking into account China's population aging, among other problems facing the nation, tend to delay the date at which China's economy will surpass America's. Even if China were to overtake the United States, the latter would soon reclaim its position. However, China's demographic decline relative to the U.S. could prompt it to undertake more risky actions, with regards to the issue of Taiwanese independence, for instance.

Meanwhile, America's allies, including Japan and the European Union, are themselves aging more quickly.

Social welfare and healthcare
The U.S. federal social security system functions through collecting payroll taxes to support older citizens. It is possible that a smaller workforce, coupled with increased numbers of longer-living elderly, may have a negative impact on the social security system. The Social Security Administration estimates that the dependency ratio (people ages 65+ divided by people ages 20–64) in 2080 will be over 40%, compared to the 20% in 2005. Rising life expectancy may result in reductions in social security benefits, devaluing private and public pension programs. Were there to be a reduction or elimination of programs such as social security and Medicare, many may need delay retirement and to continue working. In 2018, 29% of Americans aged 65–72 remained active in the labor force, according to the Pew Research Center, as Americans generally expect to continue to work after turning 65. The baby boomers who chose to remain in the work force after the age of 65 tended to be university graduates, whites, and urban residents. That the boomers maintained a relatively high labor participation rate made economic sense because the longer they postpone retirement, the more Social Security benefits they could claim, once they finally retire.

By 2030, 20% of Americans are predicted to be past the age of retirement, which could pose a burden to the healthcare system. Older and retired people tend to need more health services, which must be provided by their younger counterparts, so some demographers have theorized that this could have a negative impact on the country. Older adults will also have to deal with more chronic diseases; older adults who have worked in the construction industry have shown high rates of chronic diseases. Experts suggest that the number of geriatricians will have to triple to meet the demands of the rising elderly. Demand for other healthcare professionals, such as nurses, occupational therapists, physical therapists and dentists is also projected to rise, as well as for common geriatric healthcare needs, such as medications, joint replacements and cardiovascular operations.  Between 1966 and 2023, the number of people qualified for Medicare tripled to nearly 65 million, with 10 million seniors and disabled people being added to the system from 2013 to 2023.

Between the late 2010s and early 2020s, Millennials and Generation Z join the workforce in large numbers, allowing the U.S. to maintain a relatively large tax base, alleviating concerns over the financial sustainability of various social welfare programs. Nevertheless, in 2023, both Medicare and Social Security as they stand are projected to run out of funds by the late 2020s and mid-2030s, respectively.  With the Inflation Reduction Act of 2022, the Joe Biden administration sought to curb the cost of medical care by allowing Medicare to negotiate lower costs for certain drugs and treatments, such as insulin.

Occupational safety
Because of the many older adults opting to remain in the U.S. workforce, many studies have been done to investigate whether the older workers are at greater risk of occupational injury than their younger counterparts. Due to the physical declines associated with aging, older adults tend to exhibit losses in eyesight, hearing and physical strength. Data shows that older adults have low overall injury rates compared to all age groups, but are more likely to suffer from fatal and more severe occupational injuries. Of all fatal occupational injuries in 2005, older workers accounted for 26.4%, despite only comprising 16.4% of the workforce at the time. Age increases in fatality rates in occupational injury are more pronounced for workers over the age of 65. The return to work for older workers is also extended; older workers experience a greater median number of lost work days and longer recovery times than younger workers. Some common occupational injuries and illnesses for older workers include arthritis and fractures. Among older workers, hip fractures are a large concern, given the severity of these injuries.

Society
Population aging can potentially change American society as a whole. Many companies use a system, in which older, tenured workers get raises and benefits over time, eventually hitting retirement. With larger numbers of older workers in the workforce, this model might be unsustainable. In addition, perceptions of older adults in society will change, as the elderly are living longer lives and more active than before.

Environment 

Some demographers have suggested that a declining birth rate may have net positive effects on the country. Many environmentalists see this trend more optimistically because it could help combat the perceived problem of overpopulation. The world population is expected to reach almost 10 billion by the year 2050, which could pose a burden to Earth's natural resources. Having fewer children has been shown to be an effective way to reduce environmental impact through reduced carbon footprint and higher populations could increase the effects of climate change in the future. Additionally, there is some research supporting the idea that in well-educated countries, it might actually benefit the population to have a birth rate below replacement levels.

Proposed solutions 
A number of potential strategies have been proposed to combat the potential problems caused by an aging population. To deal with the increased demand that could be placed on the healthcare system, telehealth and virtual health monitoring has arisen as a way to help support a larger population of older adults. The Congressional Budget Office (CBO) has proposed 60 different policy options on how to save billions of dollars on Medicare, such as raising monthly premiums. As of 2023, members of Congress are considering various options to salvage Medicare and Social Security, such as addressing fraud in the Medicare Advantage program and raising the ages of legibility for Medicare and Social Security.

Alternatively, some people have advocated for offering more paid parental leave and child care, thereby encouraging people to have more children. These policies have already been employed in other areas of the world, but with mixed results. In some countries such as Germany and Czech Republic they successfully raised the birth rate, but not in others, such as in Finland, Singapore, Taiwan, Japan, and South Korea. It is unlikely that similarly pro-natalist policies would work in the U.S.

Some have argued that reduced immigration will have a larger impact on population growth than the declining birth rate. Immigration has historically been a source of growth for the US, and some have suggested that it could slow or reverse the trend of population aging or decline. However, studies have shown that immigrants from countries with high-fertility rates often have fewer children when they immigrate to a country where small families are the norm. It has also been shown that low-birth rates and sudden increases in immigration often lead to increased levels of populism and xenophobia. Arguments in favor of increasing immigration to combat declining population levels have sparked outcry from some right-wing political factions in the United States and some European countries. In the United States, past episodes of domestic turmoil have led to moratoriums on immigration. Furthermore, critics argue that the United States today struggles to integrate the various different ethnic groups already living in the country alongside new immigrants. Political scientist Robert Putnam argues that ethnic and cultural diversity has its downsides in the form of declining cultural capital, falling civic participation, lower general social trust, and greater social fragmentation. Since 1996, there have been numerous failed attempts to introduce comprehensive immigration reforms, and while many continue to view immigration as a net benefit to the nation, the American people remain mixed on whether or not they support more immigration.

See also

 Aging of Australia
 Aging of Europe
 Aging of China
 Aging of Japan
 Aging of South Korea

References

Further reading

Demographics of the United States
United States